Frederick Ellyer Cohen (born 1957) was a British businessman and former politician. He was a senator in the Bailiwick of Jersey for six years from October 2005 until unseated at the election of November 2011.

Born in Manchester, England, Cohen was educated in Jersey at Moorestown, St. Michael's Preparatory School, Victoria College and then studied accountancy at London South Bank University.

Following a career in construction, he became trustee and Vice-Chairman of the Jersey Heritage Trust. He is a former president of the Jersey Jewish Congregation, retiring in 2001. He has been prominent in community relations as trustee of the Jersey Community Relations Trust and member of the Jersey Holocaust Memorial Day Committee. He is also the author of two books on the Occupation of the Channel Islands and the history of Channel Island Silver, managed the new official history of the Occupation by Paul Sanders, organised the La Hougue Bie Slaveworker Memorial, and commissioned, fundraised and managed The Ultimate Sacrifice – the chronicle of Islanders who perished in concentration camps.

States of Jersey 
Cohen held elected office between 2005 and 2011. He entered the States of Jersey as a Senator in 2005, receiving 13,704 votes. He topped the poll in six parishes and was third in the remaining six parishes.

He held two ministerial posts. First, in 2005 he was elected to the Council of Ministers as Minister for Planning and Environment, a position he held for nearly six years becoming Jersey's longest serving minister. During this term he introduced the Eco-Active environmental awareness campaign, introduced Percentage for Art, established the Renewable Energy Commission, established the Jersey Architecture Commission and achieved approval for the New Island Plan and the North of Town Masterplan.

Second, in January 2011 he was appointed as Assistant Chief Minister with responsibility for UK and International Relations (in effect, Jersey's Foreign Minister). In this role he has led visits to India, China, Israel, and Malta. His responsibilities include developing relations with parliamentarians at Westminster. In this role he successfully negotiated UK and EU support for Jersey's Zero-Ten tax regime.

In June 2011, after the approval by the States of Jersey of his Island Plan by a majority of 38 to 1 votes and the St Helier Masterplan by 37 votes to 1,he resigned as Minister for Planning and Environment to concentrate on his UK and International responsibilities.

In 2011, Cohen received anti-Semitic threats and announced that he would not be seeking re-election. He later decided that he would stand in the October 2011 general election. In the contest for four vacancies, Cohen was unsuccessful finishing sixth out of 13 candidates with 7,922 votes his election campaign having been overshadowed by media criticism of the Portelet development, a redevelopment initially approved in 2005 before Cohen's tenure as Planning Minister. Ironical, in November 2011 the Portelet development received the 'Best apartment development in the British Isles' gold award presented at Grosvenor House.

Parish Municipality 
Prior to his election to the States of Jersey, Cohen held elected office in the Municipality of the parish of St John; serving as Constable's Officer, Centenier and Rates Assessor.

References 

Living people
1957 births
English Jews
Jersey Jews
Government ministers of Jersey
People educated at Victoria College, Jersey
Politicians from Manchester
Senators of Jersey